In Korean cuisine gui or guee is a grilled dish. Gui most commonly has meat or fish as the primary ingredient, but may in some cases also have grilled vegetables or other vegetarian ingredients. The term derives from the verb gupda, which literally means "grill". At traditional restaurants, meats are cooked at the center of the table over a charcoal grill, surrounded by various banchan and individual rice bowls. The cooked meat is then cut into small pieces and wrapped with fresh lettuce leaves, with rice, thinly sliced garlic, ssamjang (a mixture of gochujang and dwenjang), and other seasonings. The suffix gui is often omitted in the names of meat-based gui such as galbi, whose name was originally galbi gui.

Types

Meat
Meat-based grilled dishes are collectively called gogi gui.
 Bulgogi: thinly sliced or shredded beef marinated in soy sauce, sesame oil, garlic, sugar, green onions, and black pepper, cooked on a grill (sometimes at the table). Bulgogi literally means "fire meat." Variations include pork (dweji bulgogi), chicken (dak bulgogi), or squid (ojingeo bulgogi).
 Galbi: pork or beef ribs, cooked on a metal plate over charcoal in the centre of the table. The meat is sliced thicker than bulgogi. It is often called "Korean barbecue" along with bulgogi, and can be seasoned or unseasoned. A variation using seasoned chicken is called dak galbi.
 Samgyeopsal: Unseasoned pork bacon cut from the belly, served in the same fashion as galbi. Sometimes cooked on a grill with kimchi together at either side.  Commonly grilled with garlic and onions, dipped in ssamjjang and wrapped in lettuce leaves.
 Dakgui: grilled chicken
 Saengchi gui: grilled pheasant

Offal
Gui made with pig or cow's intestines is collectively called naejang gui or yang gui.
Makchang gui: grilled pork large intestines prepared like samgyeopsal and galbi, and often served with a light doenjang sauce and chopped scallions. It is very popular in Daegu and the surrounding Gyeongsang region.
Gopchang gui: similar to makchang except prepared from the small intestines of pork (or ox)

Seafood
Gui made with fish is called saengseon gui that literally means "grilled fish", while grilled shellfishes are called seokhwa gui or jogae gui
Jangeo gui, sliced & roasted eel in gochujang or ganjang
Gomjangeo gui, similar to jangeo gui but pike eel is cooked whole immediately after being killed so it is still moving on the grill
Godeungeo gui: grilled mackerel
Jogi gui: grilled croaker
Garibi gui: grilled scallops
Samchi gui: grilled Japanese Spanish mackerel
Daeha gui: grilled Chinese white shrimp
Jeonbok gui: grilled abalone

Vegetable and mushroom
Dubu gui: grilled tofu rectangles
Deodeok gui: grilled deodeok (Codonopsis lanceolata)
Beoseot gui: grilled mushroom
Songi gui: grilled matsutake
Gim gui or guun gim ( or ): grilled gim (nori)

See also
Asado
Korean barbecue
Barbecue
Regional variations of barbecue
Jeok

References

 Gui (구이) at the Doosan Encyclopedia
 Gui (구이) at the Empas / EncyKorea

External links

GuEe (roast meat) and Jeok (kebab)

Korean words and phrases
Korean cuisine
Barbecue